Poldice mine is a former metalliferous mine located in Poldice Valley in southwest Cornwall, England, United Kingdom. It is situated near the hamlet of Todpool, between the villages of Twelveheads and St Day, three miles (5 km) east of Redruth. Since the early 2000’s the area has been adopted by the local mountain biking community known as the Dice Rollers. The area is now nationally famous as the best location to ride MTB in the south west attracting attention from youtube superstars such as Ben Deakin and his friend Matt Edgie.
This is a popular location for mountain bicycling

History
A legal document of 1512 about a theft of tin "near Poldyth in Wennap" indicates that mining was probably taking place around Poldice at that time, but this mine is certainly known to have been in operation by the 17th century.

In 1748, Poldice's chief adventurer William Lemon and manager John Williams started the Great County Adit in the Carnon Valley. It formed a cheap and effective method of draining many of the mines in the locality and also provided a means of locating new lodes of ore. When the adit reached Poldice in the late 1760s, the mine was using two Newcomen steam engines, with cylinders of diameter 66 inches and 60 inches to drain the mine into the adit.

As the mine was some distance from the sea, transport to market was a problem for the mining operation. A pioneering railway, the Portreath Tramroad was opened in 1812 giving access to Portreath harbour.

In November 1821 a 90-inch Woolf single-cylinder pumping engine was installed at the mine, the third one of this size in the county, after two had been installed at Consolidated Mines in February of the same year. These were by far the largest steam engines in Cornwall at the time. In 1842 this engine was raising an average of 887 gallons per minute and it was one of the most heavily worked engines in the county. It was re-cylindered as an 85 inch in 1845 and was still working well when it was sold for £700 in August 1867 to Great Western Deep Coal Co. in the Forest of Dean.

By the 1860s the copper industry was in decline, and some time between 1869 and 1872 the mine sold £12,000 worth of redundant equipment to J. C. Lanyon & Son of Redruth, a major dealer and exporter of mine equipment. Despite these sales, the mine purchased from Perran Foundry a new 85-inch pumping engine that cost £2,250 and which was in operation by early 1873. At the time it was needed to deal with the water flooding into the mine as a result of a very wet winter, but in July 1873 after working for just 6 months, the engine was up for sale and the mine had closed because it was unable to cope with the cost of pumping water out of the workings. The engine was sold to a company in Scotland.

Minerals
The mine was extracting tin ore in 1748, but by 1788 the output of copper ore exceeded that of tin, and by the 1790s it was making a good profit. In the early 19th century the mine merged with neighbour Wheal Unity. The mine switched to arsenic extraction, although metals were still being mined in decreasing quantities, but by the 1910s most of the activity was over and although small-scale mining continued into the 1920s, it closed in 1930.

Apart from the enormous quantities of the common ores mined at Poldice, the area was also known for rarer and more valuable minerals including chalcophyllite, olivenite, mimetite and liroconite.

The site today
Today, the ruins of many mine buildings and mineshafts are visible in the Poldice Valley, which has not seen any further development since the end of mining.  The valley is now a nature reserve.

References

 Poldice Valley, Bob Acton, Landfall Publications, 1990.

Sources

Mines in Cornwall
Tin mines in Cornwall
Copper mines in Cornwall
Arsenic mines in Cornwall
Industrial archaeological sites in Cornwall